Christophe Hurni (born 1 December 1962, Switzerland) is a Swiss racing driver.

Biography
Hurni started racing at 21, competing in the Volant Elf talent search at Circuit Paul Ricard in 1983 and making the finals alongside Jean Alesi and eventual winner Éric Bernard. After a short stint in karting he moved into Formula 3, contesting mainly the Swiss championship but also various events across Europe (most notably in Monaco). Hurni then bounced around Renault Clio Cup Switzerland, Formula 3000 and Porsche Carrera Cup throughout the 1990s before stepping away from driving to focus on running his Sports Promotion team.

Hurni returned to racing in 2003, entering the Swiss Formula Renault 2.0 series for the best part of a decade before gaining notoriety competing in the final round of the 2011 GP3 Series at Monza aged 48, making him the oldest driver to have ever raced in a (Formula One-sanctioned) GP2/GP3 race weekend. The following year he entered a previous-generation Formula Renault 3.5 car into BOSS GP, before turning back to Formula Renault 2.0 in the form of V de V Challenge Monoplace.

In 2017, Hurni switched to GT racing and contested the European Ferrari Challenge. Contesting the amateur Coppa Shell championship, he finished third in 2017 before winning the 2018 championship and Ferrari World Finals.

Career results

Summary

Complete GP3 Series results
(key) (Races in bold indicate pole position) (Races in italics indicate fastest lap)

References

External links
Profile at Driver Database

1962 births
Swiss racing drivers
Swiss GP3 Series drivers
Living people

24H Series drivers
Jenzer Motorsport drivers
Ferrari Challenge drivers